The shield-nosed cobra (Aspidelaps scutatus)  is a venomous snake in the family Elapidae.

It is found in South Africa, Botswana, Mozambique, Zimbabwe, Eswatini and Namibia. They live 20-28 years old in captivity. This snake is venomous and has been known for at least one reported death of a human, even if bites are rare. The venom is neurotoxic and no currently known antivenom is available for this species.

References 

Aspidelaps
Reptiles of Africa
Reptiles described in 1849